Salto (stylized as SⱯLTO) is a French subscription streaming service. A joint venture between France Télévisions, the TF1 Group and the Groupe M6, it was launched on October 20, 2020.

Salto offers a library of films and television series from the three groups respective television networks, as well as exclusive programming. It also offer live access to their television networks, a catch-up service, and a selection of programs in advanced access before their original broadcast. A selection of films from third-party distributors is also available on the service.

On February 2023, in a joint press release, the TF1, M6 and France Télévisions groups announced their intention to end the platform, following its difficulty in attracting subscribers. Salto is set to close on March 27, 2023.

History
On June 2018, France Télévisions, the TF1 Group and the Groupe M6 announced the creation of a joint streaming service as a response to the many American services available in France, like Netflix and Amazon Prime Video. Similar to Joyn in Germany and BritBox in the United Kingdom, the United States, Canada, Australia, and South Africa. This is mainly due to trends with younger generations shunning terrestrial TV in favor of streaming services, with traditional TV fearing that they have no choice but to adapt in the rapidly changing television market.

Exclusive programming
A selection of Salto's exclusives series were later broadcast on France Télévisions, the TF1 Group or the Groupe M6 respective television networks. 

 A Confession
 A Million Little Things
 A Very British Scandal
 All American
 All American: Homecoming
 And Just Like That...
 Beecham House
 Bel-Air
 Bull (since season 6)
 Clarice
 Callboys
 C'est comme ça que je t'aime
 Charmed (SVOD exclusive only, broadcast on Syfy)
 Chucky
 The Cry
 Cryptid
 Departure
 Double Vie
 Evil
 Exit
 Face to Face
 Fantasy Island
 Fargo (since season 4)
 Flesh and Blood
 The Flight Attendant (SVOD exclusive only, broadcast on Warner TV)
 Four Weddings and a Funeral
 Grand Hotel
 The Grave
 The Hunting
 Intelligence
 Katy Keene
 Looking for Alaska
 Manifest (season 2)
 Monsterland
 Nancy Drew
 On Becoming a God in Central Florida
 Pretty Little Liars: The Perfectionists
 Quartier des Banques
 Quiz
 The Secrets She Keeps
 Sherlock in Russia
 The Sister
 Small Axe
 Sissi
 Superman & Lois
 Stargirl (SVOD exclusive only, broadcast on Warner TV)
 The Thing About Pam
 Ulven kommer
 Why Women Kill (season 2)
 Yellowstone

TV channels
 France Télévisions
 France 2
 France 3
 France 4
 France 5
 France Info
 Culturebox
 France.tv Slash
 Okoo

 TF1 Group
 TF1
 TMC
 TFX
 TF1 Séries Films
 LCI
 TV Breizh
 Ushuaïa TV
 Histoire TV
 TFOU Max

 Groupe M6
 M6
 W9
 Gulli / Gulli Max
 6ter
 Téva
 Paris Première
 TiJi
 Canal J

 Channels from third-party
 NRJ 12
 Chérie 25
 La Chaîne L'Équipe
 La Chaîne parlementaire (LCP / Public Sénat)
 TV5Monde
 Arte

References

External links 
 

Television in France
2020 establishments in France
2023 disestablishments in France
Companies based in Île-de-France
Internet properties established in 2020
Internet properties disestablished in 2023
Internet television streaming services
Subscription video on demand services
Joint ventures
France Télévisions
RTL Group
IOS software
Android (operating system) software
PlayStation 4 software
PlayStation 5 software
Xbox One software